Semyon Mikhailovich Strugachyov (born December 10, 1957) is a Soviet and Russian film and stage actor, People's Artist of Russia (2008).

Biography
Semyon Strugachyov was born on December 10, 1957 in the village of Smidovich, Smidovichsky District, Jewish Autonomous Region. Father Misha Strugashvili is half Georgian, half Mountain Jew.

In 1979, he graduated from the acting department of the Far Eastern Pedagogical Institute of Arts in Vladivostok. He also worked in the Primorsky Regional Drama Theater (Vladivostok), Gorky Academic Theater, Kuibyshev Drama Theater. In 1988 he started acting at the Saint Petersburg Lensoviet Theatre.

He made his debut in cinema in 1991. All-Russian fame to Strugachyov was brought by Aleksandr Rogozhkin’s comedy  Peculiarities of the National Hunt (1995). Subsequently, starred in all sequels of this film.

Selected filmography
  (1991) as blind painter
 Peculiarities of the National Hunt  (1995) as  Lev Soloveichik
 Operation Happy New Year (1996) as Lev Soloveichik
 Peculiarities of the National Fishing  (1998) as Lev Soloveichik
 Peculiarities of the National Hunt in Winter Season (2000) as Lev Soloveichik
 Peculiarities of National Politics (2003) as Lev Soloveichik
 Deadly Force (2004-2006) as Semyon Chernyga, forensic expert
 The Fall of the Empire (2005) as Fleishman
 The Master and Margarita (2005) as Matthew the Apostle
 Cinderella (2012) as Mikhail Levitsky
 Sherlock Holmes (2013) as Charles Gauthier, Ambassador of France
 Kidnapping, Caucasian Style! (2014) as the Coward
 Catherine the Great (2015) as Lestocq

Awards and honours
 Honored Artist of the Russian Federation (1999)
 People's Artist of the Russian Federation (2008)
 Medal of the Order For Merit to the Fatherland  II class Civilian Division (2018)

References

External links 
 

1957 births
Living people
People from the Jewish Autonomous Oblast
Soviet male film actors
Soviet male stage actors
Russian male film actors
Russian male stage actors
Russian male television actors
People's Artists of Russia
Honored Artists of the Russian Federation
Soviet Jews
Recipients of the Medal of the Order "For Merit to the Fatherland" II class
20th-century Russian male actors
21st-century Russian male actors
Jewish Russian actors